Harry Hughes was a British screenwriter and film director.

Selected filmography
 The Shadow of Evil (1921)
 A Rogue in Love (1922)
 A Daughter in Revolt (1928)
 The Hellcat (1928)
 Virginia's Husband (1928)
 Troublesome Wives (1928)
 His Wife's Mother (1932)
 Facing the Music (1933)
 A Southern Maid (1933)
 Their Night Out (1933)
 Song at Eventide (1934)
 The Broken Rosary (1934)
 Play Up the Band (1935)
 The Improper Duchess (1936)
 Tropical Trouble (1936)
The Last Chance (1937)
 The Gables Mystery (1938)
 Mountains O'Mourne (1938)

References

External links

Year of birth unknown
Year of death unknown
British film directors
People from Leyton